Gottfried (Dzhabrail) Alienish Gasanov (Birth name: Gottfried Alidin hwa Gyasanrin; 1900 - 1965) was a North Caucasian composer, Honored Artist of the RSFSR (1960), and a laureate of two Stalin Prizes (1949, 1951).

References

External links
  The evening devoted to life and creativity of great Dagestan composer G.Gasanov has taken place in Moscow 
 Gasanov, Gotfrid Aliyevich on The MusicSack

1900 births
1965 deaths
People from Derbent
Lezgins
Russian people of Lezgian descent
Soviet composers
Date of birth missing